Aero Zambia was an airline based in Zambia. Aero Zambia replaced the bankrupt Zambia Airways and was admitted as a full member of IATA ( International Air Transport Association )on 11 April 1996. The airline employed 300 staff and flew from Lusaka to destinations such as Johannesburg, Ndola, Nairobi, Harare and Dar es Salaam. They offered Business and Economy Classes. Aero Zambia operated two Boeing 737-200s, 9J-AFU and 9J-AFW which was a Combi version.

History 
The aircraft was founded in 1996. On 19 January 2000, the Zambian Government closed them down due to concerns with safety. The real reason was probably more to do with politics between David Tokoph and Zambian Government officials.

Fleet 

The fleet of Aero Zambia consisted of The following aircraft:

 5 Boeing 737-200
 1 Boeing 707

References

Defunct airlines of Zambia
Airlines established in 1996
1996 establishments in Zambia
2000s disestablishments in Zambia
Airlines disestablished in 2000
Companies based in Lusaka